Francisco da Silva (17 August 1957 – 14 April 2010) was the president of the National Assembly of São Tomé and Príncipe. He was provisionally replaced by Evaristo Carvalho. He is a member of the Democratic Convergence Party-Reflection Group (PCD-GR).

References

1957 births
2010 deaths
Presidents of the National Assembly (São Tomé and Príncipe)
Democratic Convergence Party (São Tomé and Príncipe) politicians